R. Walter Hundley (born January 12, 1953) served as a Republican member of the South Carolina Senate, representing the people of the 41st District. Hundley was elected in a special general election on July 17, 2012, to fulfill the remainder of Glenn F. McConnell's term following the latter's resignation to become Lieutenant Governor of South Carolina.

Early political career
Hundley was appointed by Governor Carroll Campbell as a commissioner to the South Carolina Worker's Compensation Committee.

Business career
Hundley is a workers compensation attorney in Charleston, South Carolina.  Hundley worked with an insurance defense firm for five years, but has practiced exclusively as a Plaintiff's attorney for the past twenty-five years. Prior to opening his own firm, Walter served as a South Carolina Workers’ Compensation Commissioner and Chairman.

Personal life
Hundley is married and has and three children on Wadmalaw Island.

Education
Hundley graduated Porter-Gaud School in 1971. He is a Clemson University class of 1971 alumnus with a Bachelor of Arts in English.  He earned his Juris Doctorite from the University of South Carolina School of Law.

Awards
The Order of the Palmetto was awarded to Hundley on January 10, 1995, by Former Governor Carroll Campbell.

References

Politicians from Charleston, South Carolina
Clemson University alumni
University of South Carolina School of Law alumni
Republican Party South Carolina state senators
1953 births
Living people
Lawyers from Charleston, South Carolina